The National Cyber Range is a cyber range project being overseen by DARPA to build a scale model of the Internet that can be used to carry out cyber war games. The project serves as a test range where the military can create antivirus technologies to guard against cyberterrorism and attacks from hackers.

Several organisations are involved in the development of the network, including Johns Hopkins University in Baltimore and Lockheed Martin. More than $500m has been allocated by the Department of Defense to develop "cyber technologies."

References

United States Department of Defense
Computer network security

Cyber ranges